Samuel "Samu" López Pérez (born 23 October 1991), often known as just Samuel

Football career
Born in Murcia, Samuel graduated from local Real Murcia, and spent his first year as a senior with the B-team playing in the 2010–11 Tercera División. On 10 September 2011 he first appeared for the main squad, playing the last 32 minutes in a 0–2 home loss against UD Almería in the Segunda División.

On 1 August 2012 Samuel was loaned to Coruxo FC of the Segunda División B. He finished the season with 36 appearances (31 starts, 2641 minutes of action) and scoring 5 times, and then joined Real Balompédica Linense, also on loan.

On 2 September 2014, Samuel joined La Roda CF, also in the third tier. On 29 January of the following year he moved to fellow third-tier team CD Olímpic de Xàtiva.

References

External links

1991 births
Living people
Spanish footballers
Footballers from Murcia
Association football forwards
Segunda División players
Tercera División players
Real Murcia players
Coruxo FC players
Real Balompédica Linense footballers
CD Olímpic de Xàtiva footballers
CD Eldense footballers
Orihuela CF players
La Roda CF players